William Brown was an English footballer who played in the Football League for Everton.

Background
Brown was a reserve outside-left at Everton during the inaugural Football League season. He was signed between 1887 and 1888 from Stanley (Liverpool) Football Club. He played six times mainly at outside-left.

League & Everton Debut
Outside-left was one of three problem forward positions for Everton and probably explains why Everton struggled to score goals in the 1888-1889 season.
James Costley was injured after a 6-2 home win over Derby County. On 3 November 1888 Bolton Wanderers were the visitors to Anfield and this match gave William Brown a chance for his League and Everton debut. He played outside-left. Very little happened in the first half and the scores were level, 0-0 at half-time. Early in the second-half Brown crowned his debut with a debut League goal putting a shot past Bolton goalkeeper, Sam Gillam. Bolton played well after Brown scored and quickly equalised. Brown formed a good partnership with Everton inside-left, Edgar Chadwick but it was Nick Ross who scored the winner with a powerful shot. Everton pressed for a third but it was Bolton who came closest to scoring. Everton hung on to the lead in a close fought match. Final score - Everton 2-1 Bolton Wanderers.

Playing Record
Brown's debut saw him play three successive matches at left-wing for Everton but he was left out/injured after a 2-2 draw at Turf Moor, Burnley. Brown returned to the team on 22 December 1888 for the trip to Deepdale, Preston but he now played centre-forward (another of Everton' problem positions) in place of R Morris. He played two games at centre-forward but was replaced by Jack Angus. His final appearance was for the visit of Wolverhampton Wanderers on 9 February 1889. He replaced Jack Angus at outside-left. Everton lost 2-1. Everton finished eighth in the League Scoring 35 goals, the second lowest tally by a League team in that first season.

After Football
Brown was not retained for the 1889–1890 season and disappears from the records.

References

1865 births
Date of death unknown
English footballers
Everton F.C. players
English Football League players
Association football outside forwards